The Great Sierra Mine Historic Site preserves the site of the largest mining operation in what would become Yosemite National Park. The mine was located on Tioga Hill on the crest and eastern slope of the Sierra Nevada, one of several claims intended to work the Sheepherder silver lode. The Sheepherder lode was discovered in 1860, and rediscovered by shepherd Thomas Brusky, Jr., who staked a number of claims in the area.  In 1881 all of the claims were bought out by the Great Sierra Consolidated Silver Mining Company and established the company town of Dana. Due to the 11,000 foot altitude the town was soon relocated to the bottom of the hill at Bennettville.

After an adit was driven 1784 feet into the side of the hill at an expenditure of $300,000, operations were closed down in 1884.  They resumed with modern equipment in 1933, but did not find the Sheepherder Lode, and operations ceased for good.

Today, five stone cabins, a powder house and a blacksmith shop remain. The shafts have collapsed or have been filled in.

References

Mines in California
Silver mines in the United States
Historic districts on the National Register of Historic Places in California
Industrial buildings and structures on the National Register of Historic Places in California
National Register of Historic Places in Tuolumne County, California
National Register of Historic Places in Yosemite National Park
Rustic architecture in California
Blacksmith shops